Malleza is one of 28 parishes (administrative divisions) in Salas, a municipality within the province and autonomous community of Asturias, in northern Spain.

Villages
 Acevedo (L'acebéu) 
 Borducedo (Borducéu) 
 Colubredo (Colubréo) 
 Curiscado (Curiscáu) 
 El Cándano (El Cándanu) 
 El Pumar 
 Gallinero (Gallineiru)
 La Arquera (L'arquera) 
 La Barraca 
 La Folguerosa (La Folgueirosa) 
 La Granja (La Granxa) 
 Lindemurias (Llendemurias)
 Los Rubieros (Los Rubieiros) 
 Malleza (Maeza) 
 San Cristóbal 
 Vegacebrón (Veigacebrón) 
 Villarín (Villeirín)

References

Parishes in Salas